Natural Intelligence is an Israeli intent marketing company, that was founded in 2009 and is a leader in online multi-vertical marketplaces. The company's leading brands, Top10.com and BestMoney.com, help millions worldwide make informed decisions every day. The company specializes in user acquisition, especially via paid search, and has comparison listings in a variety of topics in fields such as personal finance, business solutions and consumer services.

Natural Intelligence is one of the world’s leading online comparison providers, all without ever needing to raise external funding. In 2022, Natural Intelligence  employs over 450 people out of its headquarters and R&D center in Tel Aviv, as well as additional offices in the United States, The UK, and Australia. Founded by Nir Greenberg, the company was led by Nir Greenberg from 2009-2022. As of August 2022, Greenberg stepped down as CEO and became Chairman, while Jonathan Edelshaim was named CEO. Bootstrapped from day one, the company is reported over 500 million dollar in revenue in 2021.

In March 2017, the company acquired the Israeli start-up Capsool. and in late 2018, it opened its first US office in Atlanta. In March 2019, the company acquires the Israeli Sports-tech startup Sidelines.io, and started its operations in all US states where sports betting got legalized including New Jersey. which in February 2022 raised $25 million funding round led by investment firms NFX and MoreTech.  In 2019 Natural Intelligence acquired British company Tipstrr for an undisclosed fee. According to a study performed by Natural Intelligence in 2018 for the Mortgage Industry, search volume for mortgage non-branded terms has risen by more than 200 percent, while search volume of mortgage branded terms decreased by more than 60 percent.

The company is known for its commitment to the LGBTQ community in Israel and offers 50K shekels to any LGBTQ employee who undergoes a surrogacy procedure outside of Israel. The company's Chief People Officer, Neta Feller, was recognized as a top 50 Ally Executive for 2018 by the Financial Times.

Natural Intelligence is a reputable employer in Israel and reaches top ranks in Dun & Bradstreet and BDI Best Tech Companies to Work for in Israel.

Natural Intelligence is based in ToHa Tower, at 6 Totzeret HaAretz St. in Tel Aviv, Israel.

References

External links
 

Online companies of Israel
Israeli companies established in 2009